A Wonderful Wife is a 1922 American drama film directed by Paul Scardon and written by Arthur F. Statter. It is based on the 1904 novel The Rat Trap by Dolf Wyllarde. The film stars Miss DuPont, Vernon Steele, Landers Stevens, Charles Arling, Ethel Ritchie, and Harris Gordon. The film was released on April 24, 1922, by Universal Film Manufacturing Company.

Plot
As described in a film magazine, Chum Lewin (Dupont) is interested in advancing the career of her husband, Captain Alaric Lewin (Steele), in the British military service. Alaric is secretary to Commissioner Gregory (Stevens), and, in order to secure her husband a better post, Chum professes unusual interest in Gregory and his plans and allows him to hold her hand. Gregory becomes inflamed with passion and sends Captain Lewin to a far off point in the interior of Africa, from which he determines that his secretary will never return. Chum learns of Gregory's treachery and forces him to furnish her with an escort to take her to her husband's posting. She finds him ill with fever. Gregory follows her and, when natives attack, he meets an untimely death.

Cast          
Miss DuPont as Chum Lewin
Vernon Steele as Capt. Alaric Lewin
Landers Stevens as Commissioner Gregory
Charles Arling as Halton
Ethel Ritchie as Diana
Harris Gordon as Nugent
Nick De Ruiz as Native Groom

References

External links

1922 films
1920s English-language films
Silent American drama films
1922 drama films
Universal Pictures films
Films directed by Paul Scardon
American silent feature films
American black-and-white films
1920s American films